Club Deportivo Condal was a Spanish football club based in Barcelona, in the autonomous community of Catalonia. Founded in 1934 and dissolved in 1970, it held home games at Camp de Les Corts, with a capacity of 25,000 spectators.

History 
Condal was founded on 1 August 1934 as Sección Deportiva La España Industrial, being renamed Club Deportivo Condal 22 years later. Between 1956 and 1961 it played in La Liga and Segunda División, having its only top flight experience in the 1956–57 season, finishing in 16th and last position.

Condal spent the last nine years of its existence in Tercera División, with the exception of two campaigns in the second level. In 1970 it merged with Atlètic Catalunya to form a new club, FC Barcelona B who acted as FC Barcelona's reserves.

Season to season 
As La España Industrial

As CD Condal

1 season in La Liga
10 seasons in Segunda División
9 seasons in Tercera División

Logo evolution

Famous players 
 Luis Suárez
 Enric Gensana
 Mariano Gonzalvo
 Carles Rexach
 Manuel Sanchís
 Justo Tejada
 Jiří Hanke
 Dagoberto Moll

References

External links 
Profile at BDFutbol

 
Defunct football clubs in Catalonia
Football clubs in Barcelona
Association football clubs established in 1934
Association football clubs disestablished in 1970
1934 establishments in Spain
1970 disestablishments in Spain
Segunda División clubs
La Liga clubs